Boa Vista (Portuguese for "good view"), also written as Boavista, is a desert-like island that belongs to the Cape Verde Islands. At , it is the third largest island of the Cape Verde archipelago.

The island of Boa Vista is closer to the African continent than all the other islands in Cape Verde, being the easternmost island of all. The distance between Boa Vista and Senegal is only 450 km. The capital of Boa Vista, Sal Rei, is located in the north-western part of the island. Boa Vista is mainly known for its beaches, turtles and traditional music.

Geography

Boa Vista is the third largest island after Santo Antão and Santiago, with an area of 631.1 square kilometres. It is situated south of Sal and north of Maio. The island is generally flat, but it has numerous hills like Monte Estância (the highest point of the island at 387 m), Monte Santo António, Rocha Estância, Morro de Areia, Morro Negro, Monte Caçador, Pico Forcado and Monte Vigia.

Boa Vista is famous for its large beaches like Atalanta, Cabral, Chaves, Ervatão, Gatas, Santa Mónica and Varandinha. Its northernmost point is Ponta do Sol; its westernmost point Ponta Varandinha. Boa Vista is also notable for its desert Deserto de Viana and its dune fields. Boa Vista is surrounded by a number of uninhabited islets, the largest of which is Ilhéu de Sal Rei.

History 
The uninhabited island Boa Vista was discovered by António de Noli and Diogo Gomes in 1460. Until the end of the 16th century the only human activity on the island was breeding wild cattle. The island's first settlement, now known as Povoação Velha, was established in 1620 for its salt deposits, which were mainly exploited by the English. In 1820, after many pirate attacks, the population moved to Porto Inglês, later renamed Sal Rei, which had been founded at the end of the 18th century. As did much of the Cape Verdean economy, the exploitation of salt on Boa Vista also relied largely on slavery. A Portuguese-British commission to end slavery was established in Boa Vista in 1842, but slavery was not completely abolished until 1876. Until 1935 the municipality of Boa Vista also covered the island of Sal. In 1975, Cape Verde declared its independence.

Municipality

Administratively, the island of Boa Vista is covered by one municipality, Concelho da Boa Vista. This municipality consists of two freguesias (civil parishes): Santa Isabel and São João Baptista. The municipal seat is the city Sal Rei. The island's two parishes are subdivided into 9 population zones for statistical purposes:

Politics

Since 2016, the local party BASTA is the ruling party of the municipality. The results of the latest elections, in 2016:

Population 
 
In the 1830s, the population of Boa Vista was estimated at 4,000. In 2015 Boa Vista's population was 14,451. Most of the population live in Sal Rei, but there are also several smaller settlements with 10 to 100 people. With 23.3 inhabitants per km2, it is the least-dense populated island in the archipelago.

The population of Boa Vista consist of a mixture of different nationalities. The Creoles, of mixed mainland African and European descent are the biggest group of inhabitants, with no less than 70%, as a lot of Portuguese enter into a relation with the slaves of the African continent, during the colonization of Portugal, and settled in Boa Vista afterwards.

Economy 
Before, the inhabitants of Boa Vista survived off salt collection and date farming. Nowadays they still earn money from date farming but also from tourism. A lot of people do work in this touristic sector as a taxi driver, an employee in one of the hotel chains or as a salesman of souvenirs in Sal Rei. The income from tourism has risen rapidly since the coming of the international airport in 2007. There are several hotels and beach resorts on the island.

Transport 

The airport of Boa Vista is Aristides Pereira International Airport, about 5 km southeast of Sal Rei. There are ferry services from the port of Sal Rei.

The island has 64 km of national roads, the single first class national road connects Sal Rei and Rabil.

Nature
Boa Vista is not as abundant in flora and fauna as the other larger or more humid islands such as Santiago and Santo Antão; only 3% of its area is forested. However, 37% of its area is a protected area, which is the highest proportion of all inhabited Cape Verde islands. There are 14 protected areas on Boa Vista, including beaches that are important nesting areas for loggerhead sea turtles and birds. There are several endemic species, e.g. Boa Vista wall gecko (Tarentola boavistensis), Conus boavistensis, Conus salreiensis) and Plesiocystiscus bubistae.

Gallery

Sports
There are several football clubs on Boa Vista, organised in the Boa Vista Regional Football Association.

Notable residents
Aristides Pereira, Cape Verde's first president
Germano Almeida, a Cape Verdean writer

References

External links
 Tourist site, Boavista Official
 Câmara Municipal da Boa Vista

 
Municipalities of Cape Verde
Islands of Cape Verde